Credit Bank Limited (CBL), commonly referred to as Credit Bank, is a commercial bank in Kenya, the largest economy in the East African Community. It is licensed by the Central Bank of Kenya, the central bank and national banking regulator.

Overview
The bank is a medium-sized commercial bank in Kenya, East Africa's largest economy. Prior to 2010, the bank's focus was large corporations and upscale business-people. In September 2010, Credit Bank changed strategy and transformed into a retail bank, serving all segments of society and their businesses. , the bank's total assets were valued at approximately US$178.28 million (KES:17.805 billion), with shareholders' equity valued at US$28.67 million (KES:2.86 billion).

History
The bank was founded in 1986, as a non-bank financial institution (NBFI); Credit Kenya Limited. In 1995, the institution was awarded a commercial banking license and it rebranded to Credit Bank Limited.

Ownership
As at January 2016, the shares of stock of Credit Bank are privately owned by corporate and individual investors. In January 2016, Fountain Enterprises Programme Group (FEP) announced plans to acquire a controlling 75 per cent stake in Credit Bank for KSh4 billion (approx. US$40 million), pending approval of the Central Bank of Kenya. As of June 2019, the major shareholders in the bank's stock were as depicted in the table below:

Branches
The bank maintains networked branches at the following locations:

 Main Branch - Mercantile House, Koinange Street, Nairobi
 Westland Branch - Empress Plaza, Ring Road, Westlands, Nairobi 
 Industrial Area Branch - 53 Butere Road, Industrial Area, Nairobi
 Lavington Branch -  Lavington Mall, James Gichuru Road, Lavington, Nairobi
 Kisumu Branch - Swan Centre, Oginga Odinga Road, Kisumu
 Kitengela Branch - 2nd Floor, Safari House, Namanga Road, Kitengela
 Nakuru Branch I - Giddo Plaza, Eldoret-Nakuru Highway, Nakuru
 Nakuru Branch II - Polo Centre, Kenyatta Avenue, Nakuru
 Kisii Branch - Hospital Road, Kisii
 Eldoret Branch - Zion Mall, Uganda Road, Eldoret 
 Ongata Rongai Branch - Maasai Mall, Magadi Road, Ongata Rongai
 Machakos Branch - Mbolu-Malu Road, Machakos 
 Thika Branch - Second Floor, Biashara Plaza, Maama Ngina Street, Thika 
 Nyali Branch - Nyali Centre, Link Road, Nyali
 New Nairobi Branch - Nairobi
 Meru Branch - Meru
 Eldoret Branch - Kerio Valley Development Authority Building, Oloo Street, Eldoret

See also

 List of banks in Kenya
 Central Bank of Kenya
 Economy of Kenya

References

External links
 Website of Central Bank of Kenya
 Website of Credit Bank Limited
 Nyachae-linked bank seeks Sh5.4 billion diaspora buyout

Banks of Kenya
Companies based in Nairobi
Economy of Kenya
Banks established in 1986
1986 establishments in Kenya